Ericusa sowerbyi, common name the spindle-shaped volute,  is a species of sea snail, a marine gastropod mollusk in the family Volutidae, the volutes.

Description
The size of the shell varies between 95 mm and 260 mm.

Distribution
This marine species occurs off East and South Australia and off Tasmania.

References

 Bail, P & Poppe, G. T. 2001. A conchological iconography: a taxonomic introduction of the recent Volutidae. Hackenheim-Conchbook, 30 pp, 5 pl.

External links
 

Volutidae
Gastropods described in 1839